Aap Kaa Surroor is the debut music album by Himesh Reshammiya, produced by T-Series, released in 2006. 
Till date it is the top selling music album in India and the highest selling album ever released in India with around 55 million copies sold it went to become the second highest selling album in the world after Micheal Jackson Thriller.

Track listing
All songs were composed and sung by Himesh Reshammiya with lyrics penned by Sameer.

Original

Remixes

Unplugged

Music videos 
 "Tera Surroor" - "Tera Surroor" was the first of the videos to be released from this album. The music video begins with Reshammiya performing for a small audience. At the same time, it is also indirectly addressed to his violinist (played by Minissha Lamba) and love interest and the entry of another woman in his life arouses her suspicion and the video ends with him tearfully holding an "I love you" card the violinist wrote him. This version was remixed by DJ Akbar Sami. A remix video is also available for this title song.

 "Naam Hai Tera" - The second of the videos is "Naam Hai Tera"; it featured Deepika Padukone playing one of the two female leads in the video. Like the first video in the album, even this one ends inconclusively. The remix version of the same song had a very upbeat feel to it: actually being more of a dance number than an extension of the song and its sad lyrics. A remix song also featuring Deepika Padukone is also available in different sequence.

 "Samjho Na Kuch To Samjho Na" - The video for "Samjho Na Kuch To Samjho Na" also featured a love triangle. Sonal Chauhan first appeared in this music video as Reshammiya's love interest. It tells that Reshammiya wasn't able to express his love. In this video, Reshammiya, is seen playing the Guitar.

 "I Love You Sayyoni" - It featuring Nihaar Pandya and a beautiful model Candice Boucher (Durban, South Africa) who is kept captive by her other lover and Reshammiya succeeds in getting her to Nihaal.

 "Wada Tainu" - Also made into music video. It featured Yuvika Chaudhary as the lead who will marry someone else but loved Reshammiya.
 "Tu Yaad Na Aaye" - A video song has also been made of the song "Tu Yaad Na Aaye Aisa Koi Din Nahi". The video starts with people praying for a dead girl in a graveyard, who used to be Reshammiya's love interest. Then the song starts with Reshammiya recording a song in studio memorizing those moments he spent with her.

 "Chhed De Pyaar Ki Baat" - The video song depicts a girl fan of Reshammiya and her Boyfriend's story in a Club.
 Nachhle- Its Folkish - There is a video song of the song shows Reshammiya singing among girl dancers and masses and in between them he has an illusion of his love interest.

Remakes
The song "Naam Hai Tera" was recreated by Tanishk Bagchi for the 2018 film Hate Story 4, with the title Naam Hai Mera which was sung by Neeti Mohan, lyrics were re-written by Shabbir Ahmed and performed by Urvashi Rautela.

References

2006 albums
Himesh Reshammiya albums